The Ukrainian Basketball SuperLeague 2011-2012 (UBL) was the 21st edition of the professional league. The Ukrainian Basketball SuperLeague (USL) is the first-tier level of professional basketball league in Ukraine established in 1992.

The season started on 1 October 2011 and ended 25 May 2012. BC Donetsk won the championship title for the first time.

Participants

Regular season

Playoffs

Awards

MVP
 Ramel Curry – BC Donetsk

All-Superleague team

Ukrainian clubs in European competitions

Ukrainian clubs in Regional competitions

References 

Ukrainian Basketball SuperLeague seasons
1
Ukraine